Macrotona is a genus of grasshoppers in the family Acrididae and tribe Catantopini. It includes eight described species and around 35 undescribed species. They are often found in association with spinifex.

Species 

List of Orthoptera Species File:

 Macrotona australis (Walker, 1870)
 Macrotona curvicostalis (Sjöstedt, 1921)
 Macrotona genicularis (Sjöstedt, 1921)
 Macrotona lineosa (Walker, 1870)
 Macrotona mjobergi Sjöstedt, 1920
 Macrotona modesta (Sjöstedt, 1921)
 Macrotona picta (Sjöstedt, 1920)
 Macrotona securiformis (Sjöstedt, 1921)

References 

Acrididae genera
Taxa named by Carl Brunner von Wattenwyl